Psi Sagittarii, which is Latinized from ψ Sagittarii, is a triple star system in the zodiac constellation of Sagittarius. The star system is located at a distance of 298 light years from the Earth based on parallax, but is drifting closer with a heliocentric radial velocity of −12 km/s. The system is faintly visible to the naked eye has a combined apparent visual magnitude of +4.86.

The inner pair of this triple star system, components Ba and Bb, have an orbital period of 10.78 days and an eccentricity of 0.47. The pair consist of an A-type giant and a less evolved A-type main-sequence star with stellar classifications of A9 III + A3 V, respectively. These in turn share an orbit with the primary, component A, having a period of 20 years and an eccentricity of 0.51. The last is an orange-hued K-type giant with a class of K2 III.

Name and etymology
According to the catalogue of stars in the Technical Memorandum 33-507 - A Reduced Star Catalog Containing 537 Named Stars, this star was titled as Al Kiladah. This star, together with τ Sgr, ν Sgr, ω Sgr, 60 Sgr and ζ Sgr were Al Udḥiyy, the Ostrich's Nest.

References

External links

A-type giants
K-type giants
A-type main-sequence stars
Triple star systems
Sagittarius (constellation)
Sagittarii, Psi
Durchmusterung objects
Sagittarii, 42
179950
094643
7292